The Joni Mitchell Archives is an ongoing project to release previously unreleased recorded material by Canadian singer-songwriter Joni Mitchell. So far, each new release schedule consists of a box set collection, a compilation with material on the box set release, and a live album. The project is being overseen by Mitchell and Patrick Milligan, director of A&R for Rhino Records, the label through which the project's offerings are being released. The first release also received input from Neil Young, who had experience with the release of his own extensive archival series, and Mitchell and Young's late manager Elliot Roberts, who died during the process of planning the first box set, and to whom the release is dedicated.

The project's logo prominently features a polar bear, a visual allusion to the traditional Saulteaux name bestowed upon Mitchell by a childhood friend at her seventy-fifth birthday party. Kāwāsapizit-Wābiski-Makawko-Ikwē – the name granted and recognized by the Yellow Quill First Nation – translates to 'Sparkling White Bear Woman' in English.

Box sets

Unreleased material

Volume 1: The Early Years (1963–1967) 

The first volume of unreleased archived material, Joni Mitchell Archives – Vol. 1: The Early Years (1963–1967), was released on October 30, 2020. The five-disc box set includes the archived material that was recorded in the years preceding the release of Mitchell's debut studio album, Song to a Seagull (1968). The box set also includes a booklet with liner notes featuring conversations about the time period between writer/filmmaker Cameron Crowe and Mitchell.

Volume 2: The Reprise Years (1968–1971) 

The second volume of unreleased archived material, Joni Mitchell Archives – Vol. 2: The Reprise Years (1968–1971), was released November 12, 2021. The box set includes the archived material that was recorded in the years between the release of Mitchell's debut studio album, Song to a Seagull (1968) and her fourth studio album, Blue (1971). The set is available in multiple formats, including as a five-disc CD set and, exclusive to the official Joni Mitchell web store, a limited edition 10-LP vinyl set. Like the first set, the second volume also includes a booklet with liner notes featuring conversations about the time period between Cameron Crowe and Mitchell.

Album remasters

The Reprise Albums (1968–1971) 

The first volume of album remasters, The Reprise Albums (1968–1971), was released on July 2, 2021, by Rhino Records. The box set includes Mitchell's first four albums, all of which were released on Reprise Records: Song to a Seagull (1968), Clouds (1969), Ladies of the Canyon (1970), and Blue (1971).  In the case of Song To A Seagull, the original mix has been recently updated by mixer Matt Lee, overseen by Mitchell. The box includes an essay by Brandi Carlile.

The Asylum Albums (1972–1975) 

The second volume of album remasters, The Asylum Albums (1972–1975), was released on September 23, 2022, by Rhino Records. The box set includes Mitchell's first four albums released on Asylum Records: For the Roses (1972), Court and Spark (1974), Miles of Aisles (1974), and The Hissing of Summer Lawns (1975).

Auxiliary releases

Early Joni – 1963

The first auxiliary release in the series, Early Joni – 1963, was released on October 30, 2020, by Rhino Records. The album features one of Mitchell's first live performances, a broadcast set on Saskatoon radio station CFQC AM. The cover art for the release features a self portrait drawn by Mitchell that is based on an early photo in her personal archive, and marks the first visual artwork that she had completed in several years.

Volume 1: The Early Years (1963–1967): Highlights

The second auxiliary release in the series, a condensed version of Joni Mitchell Archives – Vol. 1: The Early Years (1963–1967), subtitled Highlights, was released on June 12, 2021, by Rhino Records. The truncated version of the Archives – Volume 1: The Early Years (1963–1967) compilation was released exclusively as a vinyl LP for Record Store Day 2021 Drop 1. Highlights features a track listing that is in chronological order. The 180 gram vinyl was limited to 5,500 copies in the United States and 15,000 copies worldwide.

Blue 50 (Demos & Outtakes)

The third auxiliary release in the series, Blue 50 (Demos & Outtakes), was released by Rhino Records on June 21, 2021, to celebrate the 50th anniversary of Blues release. The digital-only EP release consists of five unreleased demos recorded during the making of Blue.

Three of the included songs later made it on the album in finished form: a demo of "California", a demo of an early version "A Case of You" with alternate lyrics, and an outtake of "River" that features additional instrumentation from french horns. A demo of "Urge for Going" features added strings; originally written by Mitchell in the mid-1960s, she revisited the song while recording Blue and later released a different version of the song as the B-side to "You Turn Me On, I'm a Radio" from For the Roses in 1972. The EP also includes the first official release of "Hunter", an unreleased song that had previously been performed live by Mitchell and was "cut from Blue at the last minute".

The EP's album cover "features the original Blue color treatment with a previously unseen alternate photo of Mitchell by Tim Considine from the same session as the original."

Track listing
All tracks are written by Joni Mitchell.

Blue Highlights

The fourth auxiliary release in the series, a condensed version of Joni Mitchell Archives – Vol. 2: The Reprise Years (1968–1971), titled Blue Highlights, was released on April 23, 2022, by Rhino Records. The sampler album was released exclusively as a vinyl LP for Record Store Day 2022, and was made with "Joni’s insight, cooperation and creative input". Blue Highlights is the ninth overall release and fourth auxiliary release of the Joni Mitchell Archives, and like the album its material is derived from, features a track listing that is in chronological order. The vinyl release is limited to 9,000 copies in the United States and 16,000 copies worldwide. It debuted at number 150 on the Billboard 200, making it the first release from the archive series to appear on the chart.

Live albums

Live at Canterbury House – 1967

The first live album of the series, Live at Canterbury House – 1967, was released on October 30, 2020. The expansive, three-set recording was captured at the Canterbury House student missionary in Ann Arbor, Michigan, in 1967. The live album was pressed exclusively on vinyl.

Live at Carnegie Hall – 1969

The second live album of the series, Live at Carnegie Hall – 1969, was released on November 12, 2021. The two-set recording was captured at Carnegie Hall in New York City, New York on February 1, 1969. The live album was pressed exclusively on vinyl.

References

Joni Mitchell
Joni Mitchell compilation albums
Live album series
Compilation album series
2020s live albums
2020s compilation albums